John Shiress Will QC, born John Will (1840 – 24 May 1910) was a British legal writer and politician. He was born in Dundee, the son of John Will, a merchant, and his wife Mary Chambers. He was educated at Brechin Grammar School and afterwards at the University of Edinburgh and at King's College London, although he graduated from neither. In 1861, he was admitted to the Middle Temple, being called to the bar in 1864. In 1883 he was made Queen's Counsel, and was made a Bencher of the Middle Temple in 1888.

In 1885, he was elected as a member of parliament (MP) for Montrose Burghs, a position he was re-elected to in 1886, 1892, and 1895. He was a strong supporter of William Ewart Gladstone, and resigned his seat on 5 February 1896 by taking the post of Steward of the Manor of Northstead so that John Morley could be re-elected after a defeat in Newcastle-upon-Tyne.

References

Sources
Oxford DNB: Will, John Shiress

External links 
 
 

1840 births
1910 deaths
Alumni of the University of Edinburgh
Alumni of King's College London
Scottish Liberal Party MPs
Members of the Middle Temple
Members of the Parliament of the United Kingdom for Scottish constituencies
UK MPs 1885–1886
UK MPs 1886–1892
UK MPs 1892–1895
UK MPs 1895–1900
People from Dundee
19th-century King's Counsel
20th-century King's Counsel
Politicians from Dundee